Type I : The Kardashev Scale is the third studio album by rapper Greydon Square. It is his third studio album assuming his current title, and is also the third album in the Quintilogy which also encompasses albums The Compton Effect and The C.P.T. Theorem. It features notable features from rappers such as Gripp and Canibus. The album's title, like Greydon's previous two albums, is the actual name of a scientific theory. The Kardashev scale in fact comes from a theory surrounding humanity's ability to harness universal energy; it was forwarded by Russian astronomer Nikolai Kardashev.

Track listing

References

External links
http://www.antiinjusticemovement.com/page_1263235784474.html
http://greydonsquare.com/

2010 albums
Greydon Square albums